Saint-Martin-d'Uriage is a commune in the Isère department located in the French Alps, in southeastern France. The nearest major city is Grenoble.

Population

See also
Communes of the Isère department

References

Communes of Isère
Isère communes articles needing translation from French Wikipedia